Arrancourt is a commune in the Essonne department in Île-de-France in northern France.

Inhabitants of Arrancourt are known as Arrancourtois.

See also
Communes of the Essonne department

References

Communes of Essonne